Piano Sonata in G minor may refer to:

 Piano Sonata No. 19 (Beethoven)
 Piano Sonata No. 2 (Schumann)